Adrian Marsh (born 4 November 1978) is a former English cricketer. He was a left-handed batsman and a right-arm medium-pace bowler.

Marsh played for Somerset's second XI, debuting with a duck in August 1996. He represented the Derbyshire Cricket Board in the List A NatWest Trophy in three consecutive seasons.

References

External links

1978 births
English cricketers
Living people
Derbyshire Cricket Board cricketers